Morten Svalstad (born 25 September 1969) is a Norwegian former football and later coach, who played for the clubs Lillestrøm and Hamarkameratene.

Club career 

Svalstad started his football career at Nybygda IL, moving on to Lillestrøm, where he did not play any league games at senior level. In 1988 he moved to Hamarkameratene, where he stayed until the end of the 1994 season and played 80 league games, and 91 games in total.  Hamarkameratene played in Tippeligaen from 1992 to 1995, but for the 1993 season, Svalstad was demoted to second choice behind André Ulla for all matches except the home game against Fyllingen (3–0).

International career 

Svalstad played a number of age group matches for Norway from U-15 to U-21. He played for Norway in numerous youth internationals, including the 1989 FIFA World Youth Championship, where Norway finished third in their group.

Coaching career 

After retiring from football, Svalstad was coach of the women's team at Brumunddal Fotball, along with Kristin Bekkevold. In 2017 he took over Brumunddal's men's team.

References

External links 
 
 Player profile at Altomfotball.no

People from Ringsaker
Norwegian footballers
Norwegian football managers
Lillestrøm SK players
Hamarkameratene players
1969 births
Living people
Norway youth international footballers
Norway under-21 international footballers
Eliteserien players
Association football goalkeepers
Sportspeople from Innlandet